Carl Roberts may refer to:

 Carl Roberts (diplomat), diplomat and ambassador of Antigua and Barbuda
 Carl Roberts (cricketer) (born 1983), Welsh cricketer
 Charles Carl Roberts (1973–2006), American murderer